Still Life with a Turkey Pie is a 1627 still life painting by the Dutch painter Pieter Claesz, now in the Rijksmuseum in Amsterdam. It was in the collection of Baroness Cecilia-Maria van Pallandt at Keukenhof Castle from 1881. Her descendants sold it to the Hague-based art dealer S.Neistad in 1974 for 300,000 guilders. He sold it onto its present owners later the same year for 832,000 guilders.

Sources
http://hdl.handle.net/10934/RM0001.collect.8143

Still life paintings
1627 paintings
Paintings in the collection of the Rijksmuseum
Dutch Golden Age paintings